Karanayevo (Qaranay) is a rural locality (a village) in Yangurchinsky Selsoviet, Sterlibashevsky District, Bashkortostan, Russia. The population was 82 as of 2010. There are 3 streets.

Geography 
Karanayevo is located 26 km north of Sterlibashevo (the district's administrative centre) by road. Yangurcha is the nearest rural locality.

References 

Rural localities in Sterlibashevsky District